Mohamed Ali Abdel Kerim (born 1 December 1927) is an Egyptian weightlifter. He competed in the 1952 and 1960 Summer Olympics.

References

External links

1927 births
Possibly living people
Weightlifters at the 1952 Summer Olympics
Weightlifters at the 1960 Summer Olympics
Egyptian male weightlifters
Olympic weightlifters of Egypt
Sportspeople from Alexandria
World Weightlifting Championships medalists
20th-century Egyptian people